Cycnia collaris is a moth of the family Erebidae. It was described by Asa Fitch in 1857. It is found in the United States from Arizona to Florida.

Adults are on wing in April and October, possibly in two generations per year.

References

Phaegopterina
Moths described in 1857
Taxa named by Asa Fitch